Donald Wright (1907–1985) was Chief Justice of the Supreme Court of California, 1970–1977.

Donald or Don Wright may also refer to:
 
 Donald O. Wright (1892–1985), Minnesota Lieutenant Governor, 1953–1955
 Donald Wright (schoolmaster) (1923–2012), English schoolmaster
 Don Wright (athlete) (born 1959), Australian Olympic high hurdler
 Don Wright (cartoonist) (born 1934), American editorial cartoonist
 Don Wright (composer) (1908–2006), Canadian composer and musician
 Don Wright (politician) (1929–2014), American politician and perennial candidate
 Don J. Wright, American physician, government official and diplomat